NHL 2K3 is a hockey video game developed for the GameCube, PlayStation 2, and Xbox by Treyarch and published by Sega. It features Jeremy Roenick on the cover. It is the only game in the NHL 2K series to be released on the GameCube.

NHL 2K3 utilizes ESPN's presentation and was the first hockey game developed to utilize the Xbox Live and the PS2 Online online service. The rosters are from the 2002–2003 NHL season.

Reception

The game received "generally favorable reviews" on all platforms according to the review aggregation website Metacritic. It was nominated for GameSpots annual "Best Traditional Sports Game on GameCube", "Best Traditional Sports Game on Xbox" and "Best Online Game on Xbox" awards.

See also
NHL 2K

References

External links
Treyarch's Official Website
Sega's Official Website
Atari's Official Website

03
2002 video games
GameCube games
PlayStation 2 games
Treyarch games
Xbox games
Video games developed in the United States
Video games set in 2002
Video games set in 2003